Nancy Keesing  (7 September 1923 – 19 January 1993) was an Australian poet, writer, editor and promoter of Australian literature.

Early life
Nancy Keesing was born in Sydney, Australia and attended school at Sydney Church of England Girls' Grammar School (SCEGGS) and the Frensham School (Mittagong). During WW2 she worked as a naval account clerk on Garden Island in Sydney Harbour. After the war she enrolled in social sciences at the University of Sydney, and then worked as a social worker at the Royal Alexandra Hospital for Children, Camperdown (1947–1951).

Literary career
From about 1952 she worked full-time as a writer and researcher with The Bulletin magazine. She mainly worked with Douglas Stewart, particularly to research and collect historical Australian songs and bush ballads.

She was active in a number of literary associations, most notably the Australian Society of Authors. She edited the ASA journal The Australian Author from 1971 to 1974. She was chair of the Literature Board, Australia Council, 1974–1977. She was also active in the English Association and the Australian Jewish Historical Society. She became a council member of the Kuring-gai College of Advanced Education.

Her literary career covered several fields, including poetry, literary criticism, editing, children's novels and biography. One of her most well known works is Shalom, a collection of Australian Jewish stories. She wrote or edited 26 volumes. She wrote two memoirs: Garden Island People, about her work on Garden Island, and Riding the Elephant, mainly about her literary career.

Personal life
She married Dr Mark Hertzberg, a chemical engineer with CSR, and they had two children. They lived next to Kylie Tennant and her family for 20 years in Hunters Hill.

Awards and legacy
Keesing was made a Member of the Order of Australia (AM) in the 1979 Australian Day Honours for service to literature.

The annual Nancy Keesing Fellowship was founded by her husband in her honour. It is for research on aspects of Australian life and culture using the resources and archives of the State Library of New South Wales.

Bibliography 

Poetry

Fiction

Non-fiction

References

External links 
 2 poems
 Nancy Keesing Fellowship
 Children Poem

1923 births
1993 deaths
Australian memoirists
Jewish Australian writers
Australian women memoirists
Australian women poets
20th-century Australian women writers
20th-century Australian poets
Jewish women writers
Members of the Order of Australia
University of Sydney alumni
People educated at Frensham School
20th-century memoirists